Hajji Niyaz Mohammad Amiri was elected to represent Ghazni Province in Afghanistan's Wolesi Jirga, the lower house of its National Legislature, in 2005.

He is a member of the Pashtun ethnic group.  He is related to the governors of two of Ghazni's districts.  His brother, Shah Mohammad, is the Governor of the Dih Yak district.  His cousin Hajji Fazell is the Governor of the Garabagh district.  His family owns a prominent construction company.  Afghan President Hamid Karzai appointed him as governor of Logar Province on 2 December 2013.

References

Living people
Members of the House of the People (Afghanistan)
Politicians of Ghazni Province
Pashtun people
1961 births